Dbayeh is a city in Lebanon located on the Mediterranean Sea in the Matn District, Mount Lebanon, between Beirut and Jounieh. The majority of the population is Christian, apart from some Gulf Arab Muslims who live there during the summer season.

In February 1990 Dbayyeh was the scene of wide spread artillery exchanges and street fighting in an offensive launched by General Aoun against Samir Geagea’s Lebanese Forces (LF) in East Beirut. Dbayyeh was captured by Aoun’s soldiers on 6th February, half way through the two weeks of fighting in which 500 people were killed and 2000 wounded.

The city recently became a hub for shopping and entertainment with its numerous shopping malls, restaurants and cinemas as well as a leisure port and a residential waterfront project.

Dbayeh refugee camp was established in 1952 for Christian refugees from Bassa and Kafr Berem.

Notable places 
ABC Dbayeh
LeMall Dbayeh
MTV Headquarters
Waterfront City Dbayeh
Aishti by the Sea
La Marina Club

References 

Populated places in Lebanon
Maronite Christian communities in Lebanon